Mahadev Babar is an Indian politician and member of the Shiv Sena. He was elected to Maharashtra Legislative Assembly in 2009 from the Hadapsar Assembly Constituency in Pune.

Positions Held

 1997 : Elected as Corporator to Pune Municipal Corporation (1st Term)
 2002 : Reelected as Corporator to Pune Municipal Corporation (2nd Term)
 2003 : Elected as Deputy Mayor Of Pune
 2005 : Elected as Leader Of Opposition In Pune Municipal Corporation
 2007 : Reelected as Corporator to Pune Municipal Corporation (3rd Term)
 2009 : Elected to Maharashtra Legislative Assembly (1st Term)
 2017: Elected as Pune City Shivsena Chief

References 

Politicians from Pune
Shiv Sena politicians
Members of the Maharashtra Legislative Assembly
Living people
Marathi politicians
1964 births